Palma de Mallorca Airport (also known as Son Sant Joan Airport or Aeroport de Son Sant Joan) is an international airport located  east of Palma, Mallorca, Spain, adjacent to the village of Can Pastilla. In 2020, the airport handled 6.1 million passengers (after 29.7 million in 2019, in pre-COVID-19 conditions), making it the third busiest airport in Spain, after Madrid–Barajas and Barcelona-El Prat. The airport is the main base for the Spanish carrier Air Europa and also a focus airport for Eurowings, EasyJet, Jet2.com, Ryanair and Vueling. The airport shares runways with the nearby Son Sant Joan Air Force Base, operated by the Spanish Air and Space Force.

History

Early years
The interest of the Spanish Government in developing airmail during the first decades of the 20th century, led to a study of the possibility of establishing an air mail line to the Balearic Islands. Finally, in 1921, the company Aeromarítima Mallorquina established the postal line Barcelona - Palma, which used seaplanes in the port of Palma de Mallorca. Before the creation of this airline, trials were complete in two flat fields: Son Sant Joan and Son Bonet, both of which were later chosen for the construction of aerodromes.

In 1934, the company Aero-Taxi de Mallorca was created with the intention of starting tourist flights to the island, establishing a flight school in Son Sant Joan. A year later, another one was founded in Son Bonet.

In May 1935 the company LAPE, Líneas Aéreas Postales Españolas (Spanish Postal Airlines), a predecessor of Iberia; was founded. A month later, in August, the first regular air route between Madrid and Palma, stopping at Valencia, was created using the Son Sant Joan aerodrome. A year later, this line was replaced by a new one connecting Palma and Barcelona. Three years later, Lufthansa and Iberia established new lines in Son Bonet, while Son Sant Joan was beginning to be used by the military. Through the years, Son Bonet became the main civilian airport in the island, while the creation of Son Sant Joan Air Force Base limited further civilian enterprises at the aerodrome.

In 1954, the runway was enlarged and paved to enable the operation of F-86 Sabre fighters, which also meant the diversion of the Palma - Llucmajor road. During those years, the first paved taxiways and aprons were built, while Son Bonet received the first big groups of European tourists through the airlines BEA, Air France and Aviaco.

The creation of the international airport 
The increase in traffic, and the inability to enlarge Son Bonet, led the authors of the 1958 National Airport Plan to propose building a large civilian airport near the Son Sant Joan airbase. The National Airport Council approved this plan the following year and commercial traffic was transferred from Son Bonet to Son Sant Joan. This was the birth of what today is known as the Palma de Mallorca Airport. During that year, a terminal and a civilian apron were built south of the military facilities, along with a VHF communication center. Also, a VOR was installed in the island.

Finally, on 7 July 1960, the airport was opened to both domestic and international traffic.

Just two weeks later, expansion of the airport was declared urgent by the government, and on summer 1961 the works of extension of the runway and taxiway were started. At the end of the year, more plans were made, including a power plant, a communications centre and fire and rescue facilities.

Growth since the 1960s
After reaching 1 million passengers for the first time in 1962, in 1965, a new terminal was constructed, and air navigation services were completed at the end of the following year. Also in 1965 Air Spain (1965 - 1975) began operating from the airport and a smaller terminal (today's Terminal B) was planned. Passenger numbers increased rapidly, reaching 2 million in 1965. Construction of a second runway, parallel to the existing one, was begun in 1970. Two years later, terminal B went into service, and the second runway (06L/24R) opened in 1974.

In 1980, the airport carried 7 million passengers. However, this increased to nearly 10 million in 1986. This led to the construction of yet another new terminal building, the current central terminal building. This building is now the airport's primary entrance and exit and houses the airport's checkin and baggage claim areas. Construction started in mid-1993 and it was designed by the Majorcan architect Pere Nicolau Bover. During the construction in 1995, passenger numbers exceeded 15 million. The new terminal finally opened in 1997.

Today
Following a decline in passenger numbers at the airport following the September 11 attacks in 2001, passenger numbers rose steadily between 2002 and 2007 when traffic peaked at 23.2 million passengers. From 2007 onward there was a decline in passenger numbers, with 21.1 million using the airport in 2010. Today, Palma de Mallorca airport carries over 29.7 million passengers per year to their destinations, with 178,253 aircraft movements, mostly to mainland Spain, Germany and the United Kingdom.

In November 2015, Air Berlin (1978 - 2017) announced that it would shut down its hub operations at the airport which it had maintained for over ten years. All seven domestic connection routes to the mainland, such as flights to Valencia, Bilbao and Sevilla, as well as the route to Faro in Portugal ceased during spring 2016.

During the Summer months the dual-runway airport handles as many movements as London–Gatwick. On the busiest day of the week it handles as many as 1,100 movements, almost as many as London–Heathrow, the busiest airport in Europe. According to the operational data provided by AENA, the airport can handle 66 movements per hour, or almost 1,600 movements over a 24-hour operational period.

Terminals

Due to rapid growth of passenger numbers, additional infrastructure was added to the two terminals A (1965) and B (1972). This main terminal was designed by local architect Pere Nicolau Bover and was officially opened on 12 April 1997. The airport now consists of four modules: Module A (the former Terminal A Building), Module B (the former Terminal B Building), Module C and Module D (the last two were completely new sets of buildings and gates that opened along with the new central terminal and check in area in 1997). The airport can handle 25 million passengers per year, with a capacity to dispatch 12,000 passengers per hour.

Module A
The former Terminal A Building is located in the north of the airport and has blue signs. It has 28 gates of which 8 have airbridges. This is the only Module that has double airbridges attached to gates. The Pier is mainly used by flights to non-Schengen destinations including the UK and Ireland. This part of the terminal building used to be closed during winter months and is only used in the summer. For winter 2018/2019 it will remain open.

Module B
The former Terminal B Building is the smallest module, located in the north east and has green signs. It has eight gates located on the ground floor, of which none have airbridges. It is used by regional aircraft of Air Nostrum, mainly operating flights to Ibiza Airport, Menorca Airport, Valencia Airport, Lleida Airport, Asturias Airport and Santiago de Compostela Airport.

Module C
The largest of the Modules located in the east and has purple signs. It has 33 gates of which 9 have airbridges. It is used mainly by Eurowings and Condor along with EasyJet and Norwegian Air Shuttle flights to Schengen destinations. The southern area of the Module was worked on and reopened in May 2010. The refurbishment and expansion is so that the Module can handle more flights, and to improve ways to get into the pier as it is the longest walk from security control. There will also be a further eight gates with airbridges, but there will still be 33 in total.

Module D
This is located in the south and has orange signs. It has 19 gates of which 10 have airbridges. All odd numbered gates are gates with a bus transfer. During the closure of the southern area of Module C, it was used mainly for flights to Europe.

Other facilities
Previously Spanair (1986–2012) had its head office in the Spanair Building on the airport property. Both Futura International Airways and Iberworld had large operational offices on the premises of the airport but these are no longer in use.

Airlines and destinations

Passenger
The following airlines operate regular scheduled and charter flights at Palma de Mallorca Airport:

Cargo

Statistics

Annual traffic

Busiest routes

Accidents and incidents
On 4 January 1991, Douglas DC-3 EC-EQH of Aeromarket Express overran the runway on a cargo flight to Menorca Airport and was damaged beyond repair.
On 8 March 1993, Douglas C-47A EC-FAH of Aeromarket Express crashed on take-off while on a cargo flight to Madrid–Barajas Airport. Both crew were killed.
On 12 April 2002 Tadair Flight 306 operated by a Fairchild Swearingen Metroliner EC-GKR a cargo flight from Madrid–Barajas Airport to Palma de Mallorca. Flight 306 crashed on landing on runway 24L, killing both pilots.

See also
ENAIRE

References

External links

Airports in the Balearic Islands
Airport
Airports established in 1934
1934 establishments in Spain